Farid Cheklam (born September 21, 1984 in Ouarizane) is an Algerian football player who plays for MO Béjaïa in the Algerian Ligue Professionnelle 1.

Club career
On July 10, 2009, Cheklam signed a two-year contract with USM Alger.

On August 15, 2011, Cheklam signed a one-year contract with Saudi Professional League club Najran SC.

International career
He received his first call-up to the Algerian National Team from Meziane Ighil for a World Cup qualifier match against Gabon on October 8, 2005. After several call-ups in 2006, he received another invitation by Jean-Michel Cavalli for a friendly against Brazil on August 22, 2007, but finally never making any appearance.

On April 5, 2008, he received his first call up to the Algeria A' National Team for a friendly against USM Blida.

References

External links
 

1984 births
Living people
People from Ouarizane
Algerian footballers
USM Alger players
ASO Chlef players
Algerian Ligue Professionnelle 1 players
Algeria A' international footballers
Algeria under-23 international footballers
Expatriate footballers in Saudi Arabia
Algerian expatriate sportspeople in Saudi Arabia
Najran SC players
Algerian expatriate footballers
CS Constantine players
Saudi Professional League players
Association football defenders
21st-century Algerian people